Samant Kumar Goel is an Indian civil servant working as an intelligence officer and is of the IPS cadre. He is the current Chief of the Research and Analysis Wing, India's foreign intelligence agency. He was appointed as the Chief of R&AW on 26 June 2019 replacing Anil Dhasmana. In June 2022, his tenure as Secretary, R&AW was extended upto 30th June, 2023.

Biography 
Goel, who belongs to the Punjab cadre, was involved in the planning of the Balakot air strike and played an important role in checking militancy in Punjab. Mr. Goel, a recipient of the  Police Medals for Gallantry and Meritorious Service, joined the R&AW in 2001.
 
Goel has also served as Chief of Station, Europe Desk and as Chief of Station in London.

References

Indian police officers
Living people
Year of birth missing (living people)